Cyathochaeta is a genus of rhizomatous perennial sedges.

They have culms that are mostly noded. The leaves are mostly basal, often with one cauline and have ligule membranes. When flowering they produce a panicle-like, narrow inflorescence with distant nodes containing several spikelets at each node with a single bisexual flower.

There are six known species all of which are endemic to Australia.

The genera was first described in 1848 by the German botanist Christian Gottfried Daniel Nees von Esenbeck.
	
List of species:
Cyathochaeta avenacea (R.Br.) Benth.
Cyathochaeta clandestina (R.Br.) Benth.
Cyathochaeta diandra (R.Br.) Nees 
Cyathochaeta equitans K.L.Wilson	
Cyathochaeta stipoidesK.L.Wilson
Cyathochaeta teretifolia W.Fitzg.

References

 
Cyperaceae genera